Barham may refer to:

Places
Barham, New South Wales, Australia
Barham, Huntingdonshire, Cambridgeshire, England
Barham, South Cambridgeshire, a Domesday place in Linton, Cambridgeshire, England
Barham, Kent, England
Barham, Suffolk, England

People

Given name
 Barham Salih (born 1960), President of Iraq

Surname
 Charles Foster Barham (1804–1884), Cornish physician and antiquarian
 Edwards Barham (1937–2014), American politician
 Jaxson Barham (born 1988), Australian footballer
 Joseph Foster Barham (1759–1832), English politician
 Peter Barham (born 1950), physicist and molecular gastronomer
 Meriel Barham, musician   
 Phillip Barham (born 1957), American saxophonist
 Richard Barham (1788–1845), English cleric, novelist and poet

Title
 Baron Barham, any of several, most notably:
 Charles Middleton, 1st Baron Barham (1726–1813), Royal Navy admiral and politician

Other uses
 Barham River, in The Otways region of Victoria, Australia
 HMS Barham, four ships of the Royal Navy named after the admiral

See also